The following lists events that happened during 1971 in Laos.

Incumbents
Monarch: Savang Vatthana 
Prime Minister: Souvanna Phouma

Events

February
8 February-25 March - Operation Lam Son 719

Deaths
10 February - Larry Burrows, British photojournalist (b. 1926)

References

 
1970s in Laos
Years of the 20th century in Laos
Laos
Laos